Joseph Duncan Ritchie (26 September 1886 – 24 May 1975) was an Australian rules footballer who played with St Kilda in the Victorian Football League (VFL).

Family
The son of Joseph Duncan Ritchie (1848–1922), and Mary Jane Ritchie (1855–1937), née Tawse, Joseph Duncan Ritchie was born in Numurkah on 26 September 1886.

He married Alice May Coles (1893–1975) in 1917.

Football
Ritchie was recruited from the Drumanure Football Club, in the Goulburn Valley Football Association (GVFA), after he was best on ground in Drumanure's 1908 GVFA grand final win against the Muckatah Football Club.

Notes

External links 

1886 births
1975 deaths
Australian rules footballers from Victoria (Australia)
St Kilda Football Club players